Route 214 is a two-lane east/west highway in Quebec, Canada. Its links Route 112 in East Angus to  Route 161 in Nantes via Scotstown, Hampden and Milan.

Municipalities along Route 214
 East Angus
 Bury
 Lingwick
 Scotstown
 Hampden
 Milan
 Nantes

Major intersections

See also
 List of Quebec provincial highways

References

External links 
 Provincial Route Map (Courtesy of the Quebec Ministry of Transportation) 
 Route 214 at Google Maps

214